There are two species of lizard named Yarrow's spiny lizard:

 Sceloporus jarrovii, native to the southwestern United States and northern Mexico
 Sceloporus cyanostictus, endemic to Mexico